The Astronomical Calculation Institute (ARI) is a research institute in Heidelberg, Germany, dating from the 1700s.  Beginning in 2005, the ARI became part of the Center for Astronomy at Heidelberg University.  Previously, the institute directly belonged to the state of Baden-Württemberg.

Description 

The ARI has a rich history.  It was founded in 1700 in Berlin-Dahlem by Gottfried Kirch. It had its origin in a patent application by Frederick I of Prussia, who introduced a monopoly on publishing star catalogs in Prussia. In 1945 the Institute was moved by the Americans nearer to the United States Army Garrison Heidelberg. On January 1, 2005 the combined Center for Astronomy institute formed by combining ARI, with the Institute of Theoretical Astrophysics (ITA) and the Landessternwarte Heidelberg-Königstuhl ("Heidelberg-Königstuhl State Observatory", LSW).

The ARI has been responsible among other things for the Gliese catalog of nearby stars, the fundamental catalogs FK5 and FK6, and the annually-published "Apparent Places of Fundamental Stars" (APFS), stellar ephemerides that provide high-precision mean and apparent positions of over three thousand stars for each day.

During 1938–1945, whilst based in Berlin, ARI published the academic journal Astronomical Notes.
, ARI was not limited to only publishing star catalogs, but has a wider research scope, including gravitational lensing, galaxy evolution, stellar dynamics, and cosmology. ARI is also involved in space astronomy missions including the Gaia mission.

In 2007 professors Eva K. Grebel and Joachim Wambsganß (de) became co-directors of the institute.

Other researchers involved with the institute include Hartmut Jahreiß author of the updated Gliese Catalogue of Nearby Stars; Eugene Rabe; Lutz D. Schmadel, author of the Dictionary of Minor Planet Names; Hans Scholl; and Rainer Spurzem working with N-body simulations.

Directors

Between 1700 and 2007 there was a single director of the institute at a time.  From 2007 onwards there were joint co-directors of the institute:

Notes

See also

 Gottfried Kirch
 Center of Astronomy of the University of Heidelberg
 Astronomische Gesellschaft

External links
 Homepage of the Astronomisches Rechen-Institut
 MODEST, dynamics of star clusters, galaxies and galactic nuclei
 GRACE, project led by Rainer Spurzem to use reconfigurable hardware for astrophysical particle simulations

1700 establishments in the Holy Roman Empire
Heidelberg University
Heidelberg
Astronomy institutes and departments
Research institutes in Germany
Astrophysics institutes
Scientific organizations established in 1700